is a Japanese Muay Thai kickboxer, currently competing in the bantamweight division of RISE. 

As of March 2023, he is ranked as the fifth best super flyweight (-55 kg) kickboxer in the world by Beyond Kick and sixth best flyweight (-56.7 kg) by Combat Press.

Martial arts career

Early career
Osaki made his professional debut at J-NETWORK J-KICK 2016～Honor the fighting spirits～2nd with a unanimous decision victory over Idomu Tateshima. He amassed a 10-2-1 record, before fighting Satoshi Katashima for the WMC Japan Super Flyweight title at Muay Lok 2018 Challenge. Osaki won the title with a fourth-round TKO.

In his next fight, at J-KICK 2018～4th～, Osaki fought Masanori Matsuzaki for the J-NETWORK Super Flyweight title. He won the fight by unanimous decision.

On May 26, 2019, Osaki fought Koudai Hirayama for the HOOST CUP -53kg title. Hirayama won the fight by an extra round majority decision.

RISE

Bantamweight
Osaki faced Jin Mandokoro in his RISE debut at RISE 135 on November 4, 2019. He lost the fight by unanimous decision. Osaki faced Kazuya Okuwaki, in his second RISE appearance, at RISE 142 on September 4, 2019. He won the fight by a first-round knockout, flooring Okuwai with a high kick.

Osaki faced the third-ranked RISE bantamweight contender Kyosuke at RISE 145 on January 30, 2021. He won the fight by a second-round knockout. Osaki dropped his opponent with a low kick 30 seconds into the final round of the contest, which left his opponent unable to rise from the canvas.

Osaki faced Kaito Fukuda for the BOM Bantamweight title at BOM WAVE 04 on April 11, 2021. He won the fight by unanimous decision, with two scorecards of 49–48 and one scorecard of 49–47. After capturing his third professional championship, Osaki was booked to face Azusa Kaneko in a reserve fight of the 2021 RISE Dead or Alive Tournament, which took place on July 18, 2021. He won the fight by unanimous decision, with scores of 30–29, 30–29 and 30–28.

Osaki was scheduled to face Koudai Hirayama in a tournament reserve match at RISE WORLD SERIES 2021 Yokohama on September 23, 2021. The two fought previously on May 26, 2019, with Hirayama winning by an extra round majority decision. Osaki was later rescheduled to face Shiro in the tournament semifinals, as a short notice replacement for his brother Kazuki Osaki. He was later removed from the tournament, as he had missed weight by 3.2 kg.

Catchweight bouts
Osaki was booked to face Tatsuto Ito at 57.5kg for RISE 156 on March 27, 2022. He won the fight by unanimous decision, with all three judges scoring the bout 30–28 in his favor.

Osaki faced Yugo Kato in a 55.5 kilogram bout at the May 28, 2022, NO KICK NO LIFE event. He won the fight by a fourth-round technical knockout.

Osaki faced Jyosei at RISE 160 on July 29, 2022, in a 56 kg catchweight bout. He won the fight by a first-round technical knockout, after knocking Jyosei down three times by the midway point of the opening round.

Return to bantamweight
Osaki faced Shiro at RISE World Series 2022 on October 15, 2022. They were initially expected to face each other in the semifinals of the 2021 RISE "Dead or Alive" bantamweight tournament, before the fight was cancelled due to Osaki missing weight. He lost the fight by unanimous decision, after an extra fourth round was fought.

Osaki faced Seiki Ueyama at RISE World Series / SHOOTBOXING-Kings 2022 on December 25, 2022. At the official weigh-ins, Ueyama missed weight by 1.5 kg, which resulted in him being deducted two points before the start of the fight and having to fight in bigger gloves. Osaki won the fight by unanimous decision, with one scorecard of 29–28 and two scorecards of 29–27.

Osaki faced Ryoga Terayama in the main event of RISE 165 -RISE 20th Memorial event- on February 23, 2923. The fight ended in a majority decision draw. Osaki landed an accidental low blow midway through the final round, which rendered his opponent unable to continue fighting and prompted the referee to call for a technical decision.

Championships and accomplishments
Professional
J-NETWORK
 2018 J-NETWORK Super Flyweight 

World Muay Thai Council
 2018 WMC Japan Super Flyweight Champion 

Battle of Muay Thai
 2021 BOM Bantamweight Champion 

Amateur
 2013 Muay Thai Windy Super Fight -40kg Champion
 2014 All Japan Jr. Kick -45kg Champion
 2015 J-NETWORK All Japan A-league -53kg Winner & Spirit Award

Fight record

|-  style="background:#c5d2ea;"
| 2023-02-23 || Draw ||align=left| Ryoga Terayama || RISE 165 -RISE 20th Memorial event-|| Tokyo, Japan || Tech. Decision (Majority) || 3 ||1:54
|-
|-  style="background:#cfc;"
| 2022-12-25|| Win ||align=left| Seiki Ueyama || RISE WORLD SERIES / SHOOTBOXING-KINGS|| Tokyo, Japan || Decision (Unanimous) ||3  ||3:00
|-
! style=background:white colspan=9 |

|-  style="text-align:center; background:#fbb"
| 2022-10-15 || Loss ||align=left| Shiro|| RISE World Series 2022 || Tokyo, Japan || Ext.R Decision (Unanimous) || 4||3:00
|-
|-  style="text-align:center; background:#cfc"
| 2022-07-29|| Win ||align=left| Jyosei || RISE 160 || Tokyo, Japan || TKO (Three knockdowns) || 1 || 1:35
|-  style="text-align:center; background:#cfc"
| 2022-05-28|| Win ||align=left| Yugo Kato || NO KICK NO LIFE || Tokyo, Japan || TKO (Doctor stoppage) ||4 ||2:20
|-  style="text-align:center; background:#cfc;"
| 2022-03-27|| Win || align=left| Tatsuto || RISE 156 || Tokyo, Japan || Decision (Unanimous) ||3||3:00
|-  style="text-align:center; background:#cfc;"
| 2021-07-18||Win||align=left| Azusa Kaneko || RISE WORLD SERIES 2021 - Dead or Alive Tournament, Reserve Fight || Osaka, Japan || Decision (Unanimous) ||3  ||3:00
|-  style="text-align:center; background:#cfc;"
| 2021-04-11|| Win ||align=left| Kaito Fukuda || BOM WAVE 04 – Get Over The COVID-19, Bantamweight Championship Final  || Yokohama, Japan || Decision (Unanimous)  || 5 || 3:00 
|-
! style=background:white colspan=9 |
|-  style="text-align:center; background:#cfc;"
| 2021-01-30 || Win ||align=left| Kyosuke || RISE 145 || Tokyo, Japan || KO (Low Kick)||2 ||
|-  style="text-align:center; background:#cfc;"
| 2020-12-06 || Win ||align=left| Sanchai TEPPENGYM || BOM WAVE 03 ~ Get Over The COVID-19, Bantamweight Championship Semi Final  || Yokohama, Japan || Decision (Split)  ||5 ||3:00
|-  style="text-align:center; background:#cfc;"
| 2020-09-04 ||Win ||align=left| Kazuya Okuwaki ||RISE 142|| Tokyo, Japan|| KO (High Kick) || 1 || 2:32
|-  style="text-align:center; background:#FFBBBB;"
| 2019-11-04 || Loss||align=left| Jin Mandokoro ||RISE 135|| Tokyo, Japan||Decision (Unanimous) || 3 || 3:00
|-  style="text-align:center; background:#CCFFCC;"
| 2019-10-04 || Win ||align=left| Takumi Hamada ||KNOCK OUT X REBELS|| Tokyo, Japan||Decision (Unanimous) || 3 || 3:00
|-  style="text-align:center; background:#CCFFCC;"
| 2019-09-10 || Win ||align=left| Kotchasarn Sor Jor Toipaedriew || Lumpinee Stadium|| Bangkok, Thailand|| KO (Left Hook to the Body) || 2 ||
|-  style="text-align:center; background:#CCFFCC;"
| 2019-08-04 || Win ||align=left| Naoki Ishikawa || KICK ORIGIN|| Tokyo, Japan|| KO (Left Uppercut) || 3 ||
|-  style="text-align:center; background:#FFBBBB;"
| 2019-05-26 || Loss||align=left| Koudai || HOOST CUP KINGS NAGOYA 6|| Nagoya, Japan || Ext.R Decision (Majority) || 4 || 3:00
|-
! style=background:white colspan=9 |
|-  style="text-align:center; background:#CCFFCC;"
| 2019-04-20 || Win ||align=left| Yuya Kosaka || Norainu Matsuri 5 Mamoruna Semeru ! Haru Nanda|| Tokyo, Japan|| KO (Right Cross) || 2 || 1:12
|-  style="text-align:center; background:#FFBBBB;"
| 2019-02-11 || Loss ||align=left| Yoshiho Tane || KNOCK OUT 2019 WINTER || Tokyo, Japan|| TKO (Punches)|| 5 || 0:51
|-  style="text-align:center; background:#CCFFCC;"
| 2019-01-16 || Win ||align=left| Yoshiki Tane || ROAD TO KNOCK OUT Vol. 3|| Tokyo, Japan|| KO (Punches)|| 2 || 1:48
|-  style="text-align:center; background:#CCFFCC;"
| 2018-12-15 || Win ||align=left| Khotchasarn Wor.Wiwatnanon || Lumpinee Stadium || Bangkok, Thailand|| KO (Left Hook to the body)|| 2 ||
|-  style="text-align:center; background:#CCFFCC;"
| 2018-10-20 || Win ||align=left| Masanori Matsuzaki || J-KICK 2018～4th～ || Tokyo, Japan|| Decision (Unanimous)|| 5 || 3:00
|-
! style=background:white colspan=9 |
|-  style="text-align:center; background:#CCFFCC;"
| 2018-09-23 || Win ||align=left| Satoshi Katashima || Muay Lok 2018 Challenge || Tokyo, Japan|| TKO (Left Elbow)|| 4 || 2:39
|-
! style=background:white colspan=9 |
|-  style="text-align:center; background:#CCFFCC;"
| 2018-08-19 || Win ||align=left| Tatsuya Hibata || J-NETWORK J-KICK 3rd || Tokyo, Japan|| KO (Left Elbow)||2||
|-  style="text-align:center; background:#CCFFCC;"
| 2018-07-15 || Win ||align=left| MASA BRAVELY || Muay Lok 2018 Global || Tokyo, Japan|| Decision (Unanimous)|| 3 || 3:00
|-  style="text-align:center; background:#CCFFCC;"
| 2018-05-20 || Win ||align=left| Yuya Hayashi || HOOST CUP KINGS NAGOYA 4 || Nagoya, Japan||TKO|| 3 ||2:05
|-  style="text-align:center; background:#fbb;"
| 2018-03-17 || Loss ||align=left| Norangnoi Korsenchun|| Lumpinee Stadium || Bangkok, Thailand ||Decision || 5 || 3:00
|-  style="text-align:center; background:#CCFFCC;"
| 2017-12-10 || Win ||align=left|  Mori|| J-NEXUS 2017～J-NETWORK 20th Anniversary～NIGHT || Tokyo, Japan ||KO || 2 ||
|-  style="text-align:center; background:#CCFFCC;"
| 2017-09-30 || Win ||align=left| Kazane || Hoost Cup KINGS NAGOYA 3|| Nagoya, Japan ||Decision (Unanimous)|| 3 || 3:00
|-  style="text-align:center; background:#CCFFCC;"
| 2017-08-20 || Win ||align=left|  || Suk Wan Kingtong || Saraburi, Thailand || KO || 2 ||
|-  style="text-align:center; background:#CCFFCC;"
| 2017-07-23 || Win ||align=left| JIRO|| J-FIGHT & J-GIRLS 2017～J-NETWORK 20th Anniversary～5th || Tokyo, Japan ||KO (Left Middle Kick) || 1 || 1:29
|-  style="text-align:center; background:#CCFFCC;"
| 2017-05-28 || Win ||align=left| Masayoshi Kunimoto || HOOST CUP STAND FIGHTING NETWORK KING|| Nagoya, Japan ||Decision (Unanimous)|| 3 || 3:00
|-  style="text-align:center; background:#c5d2ea;"
| 2017-03-05 || NC||align=left| Atsumu ||Muay Lok 2017 1st|| Tokyo, Japan ||Doctor Stop (Head clash)|| 1 ||
|-  style="text-align:center; background:#CCFFCC;"
| 2016-11-20 || Win ||align=left| Takenari Izumi || HOOST CUP STAND FIGHTING NETWORK KING|| Nagoya, Japan ||TKO (Left Knee) || 1 ||2:15
|-  style="text-align:center; background:#FFBBBB;"
| 2016-06-26 || Loss ||align=left| Yuki Kojima || J-NETWORK J-FIGHT & J-GIRLS 2016 3rd|| Tokyo, Japan ||Decision (Majority) || 3 ||3:00
|-  style="text-align:center; background:#CCFFCC;"
| 2016-05-05 || Win ||align=left| Idomu Tateshima || J-NETWORK J-KICK 2016～Honor the fighting spirits～2nd|| Tokyo, Japan ||Decision (Unanimous) || 3 ||3:00
|-
| colspan=9 | Legend:    

|-  style="background:#cfc;"
| 2016-03-13 || Win||align=left| Wataru Suzuki || MuayThai Super Fight Suk Wan Kingthong vol.4 || Tokyo, Japan || Decision  || 2 || 2:00
|-  style="background:#fbb;"
| 2016-03-13 || Loss||align=left| Tsubasa Kaneko || MuayThai Super Fight Suk Wan Kingthong vol.4 || Tokyo, Japan || Decision  || 2 || 2:00
|-
|- style="background:#CCFFCC;"
| 2015-11-22||Win || align="left" | Jukiya Ito ||J-NETWORK Amateur A-League Tournament, Final||Tokyo, Japan|| Decision (Unanimous) || 3 || 2:00
|-
! style=background:white colspan=9 |
|- style="background:#CCFFCC;"
| 2015-11-22||Win || align="left" | Hiroshi Watabe ||J-NETWORK Amateur  A-League Tournament, Semi Final||Tokyo, Japan|| KO || 1 || 3:00
|- style="background:#CCFFCC;"
| 2015-11-22||Win || align="left" | Yuki Miyashita ||J-NETWORK Amateur  A-League Tournament, Quarter Final||Tokyo, Japan|| KO || 1 || 1:30
|- style="background:#CCFFCC;"
| 2015-07-26||Win || align="left" | Hideaki Hishinuma || J-NETWORK All Japan A-league -53kg, Final ||Tokyo, Japan|| Decision (Unanimous)|| ||
|- style="background:#CCFFCC;"
| 2015-07-26||Win || align="left" | Yusei Sakurai || J-NETWORK All Japan A-league -53kg, Semi Final ||Tokyo, Japan|| Decision (Unanimous)|| ||
|- style="background:#CCFFCC;"
| 2014-08-17||Win || align="left" | Haruto Yasumoto ||MUAYTHAI WINDY SUPER FIGHT vol.17 ||Tokyo, Japan|| Decision (Unanimous) || 3 || 2:00
|- style="background:#CCFFCC;"
| 2014-06-29||Win || align="left" | Haruto Abe ||Muay Thai WINDY Super Fight vol.16, Final ||Tokyo, Japan|| TKO (Knee) || 3 || 0:48
|- style="background:#CCFFCC;"
| 2014-06-29||Win || align="left" | Kohei Watanabe ||Muay Thai WINDY Super Fight vol.16, Semi Final ||Tokyo, Japan|| Decision ||  ||
|- style="background:#c5d2ea;"
| 2014-04-27||Draw || align="left" | Yuuta Sasaki ||Muay Lok 2014 - 1st ||Tokyo, Japan|| Decision (Unanimous) || 3 || 2:00
|-  style="background:#cfc;"
| 2014-03-30|| Win||align=left| Takasuke Sekimoto || 3rd All Japan Jr. Kick -55kg, Final || Tokyo, Japan || Decision ||  || 
|-
! style=background:white colspan=9 |
|-  style="background:#cfc;"
| 2014-03-30|| Win||align=left| || 3rd All Japan Jr. Kick -55kg, Semi Final || Tokyo, Japan || Decision ||  ||
|- style="background:#CCFFCC;"
| 2014-01-19||Win || align="left" |  ||BRIDGE one match challenge 28th || Japan|| Decision || 2 || 1:30
|- style="background:#CCFFCC;"
| 2013-08-11||Win || align="left" | Asato Kataoka || Muay Thai WINDY Super Fight vol.14 ||Tokyo, Japan|| Decision || 5||1:30 
|-
! style=background:white colspan=9 |
|- style="background:#FFBBBB;"
| 2013-03-30||Loss || align="left" | Toursak Sakbanton||Muay Thai Windy Super Fight || Trang province, Thailand|| Decision ||  ||
|- style="background:#fbb;"
| 2012-11-23||Loss|| align="left" | Kaishuu Harada ||Hoost Cup Spirit 2 ||Nagoya, Japan|| TKO || 2 ||
|- style="background:#CCFFCC;"
| 2012-09-23||Win || align="left" | Ryuu Miyajima ||BRIDGE one match challenge 22nd ||Aichi Prefecture, Japan|| Decision || 3 || 2:00
|- style="background:#CCFFCC;"
| 2012-05-13||Win || align="left" | Kenshin Tomihira||BRIDGE one match challenge 20th ||Aichi Prefecture, Japan|| Decision || 2 || 2:00
|- style="background:#FFBBBB;"
| 2012-03-04||Loss || align="left" | Kouki Yamada||BRIDGE one match challenge 19th ||Aichi Prefecture, Japan|| Decision || 2 || 1:30
|- style="background:#CCFFCC;"
| 2012-03-04||Win || align="left" | Shonosuke Suzu||BRIDGE one match challenge 19th ||Aichi Prefecture, Japan|| Decision || 2 || 1:30
|- style="background:#CCFFCC;"
| 2011-10-23||Win || align="left" | Jou Hiromatsu||BRIDGE one match challenge 20th ||Nagoya, Japan|| Decision (Unanimous) || 2 || 2:00
|- style="background:#CCFFCC;"
| 2011-10-16||Win || align="left" | Kenji Kawada||BRIDGE one match challenge 18th　　 ||Nagoya, Japan|| Decision (Unanimous) || 2 || 1:30
|- style="background:#CCFFCC;"
| 2011-10-16||Win || align="left" | Tomoya Hiratsuka||BRIDGE one match challenge 18th　　 ||Nagoya, Japan|| Decision (Unanimous) || 2 || 1:30
|- style="background:#CCFFCC;"
| 2011-09-19||Win || align="left" | Kenshin Tomihira||HEAT NEW AGE ||Aichi Prefecture, Japan|| Decision (Unanimous) || 2 || 2:00
|- style="background:#FFBBBB;"
| 2011-07-03||Loss|| align="left" | Yuuta Sasaki||Muay Thai WINDY Super Fight in NAGOYA ～Muay Tyhoon!～ ||Nagoya, Japan|| Decision (Unanimous) || 2 || 2:00
|- style="background:#CCFFCC;"
| 2011-05-22||Win|| align="left" | Kaito Matsuda||Shoot Boxing Challenge 27||Nagoya, Japan|| Decision (Unanimous) || 2 || 2:00
|- style="background:#CCFFCC;"
| 2011-04-02||Win|| align="left" | Kippei Niina|| MuayLok 2011 2nd||Nagoya, Japan|| Decision (Unanimous) || 2 || 2:00
|- style="background:#CCFFCC;"
| 2011-02-20||Win|| align="left" | Ren Shimizu||Shoot Boxing Challenge 26||Nagoya, Japan|| Decision (Unanimous) || 2 || 2:00
|- style="background:#CCFFCC;"
| 2010-11-07||Win|| align="left" | Yuuto Narusawa||BRIDGE　one match challenge 15th ||Aichi Prefecture, Japan|| Decision (Unanimous) || 2 || 2:00
|- style="background:#CCFFCC;"
| 2010-10-03||Win|| align="left" | Yuusuke Watanabe||Shoot Boxing Challenge 24 ||Aichi Prefecture, Japan|| TKO || 1 ||  
|-
| colspan=9 | Legend:

See also
List of male kickboxers

References

1999 births
Living people
Japanese male kickboxers
Flyweight kickboxers
Sportspeople from Aichi Prefecture